McGilvray is a surname. Notable people with the surname include:

Alan McGilvray (1909–1996), Australian cricketer
Bill McGilvray (1883–1952), American baseball player
Bill McGilvray (footballer) (1895–1984), Australian rules footballer
Dean McGilvray (born 1988), English rugby league player
Dennis B. McGilvray (born 1943), American anthropologist
Scott McGilvray (1966–2017), American educator and politician

See also
Fort McGilvray, a United States military fortification in Alaska
McGilvray Medal